Björn Spaeter (born 4 September 1974) is a German former rower. He competed in the men's lightweight coxless four event at the 2000 Summer Olympics.

References

External links
 

1974 births
Living people
German male rowers
Olympic rowers of Germany
Rowers at the 2000 Summer Olympics
People from Radolfzell
Sportspeople from Freiburg (region)